The World of Music was a Canadian variety television series which aired on CBC Television from 1960 to 1961.

Premise
Each episode of this series covered a particular genre, nationality or region. Themes included multicultural music, opera, current songs and dance tunes. Wally Koster hosted A World of Music and introduced visiting artists such as Ernestine Anderson, Dorothy Collins, Alan and Blanche Lund, Lister Sinclair, Joyce Sullivan, The Journeymen and The Travellers.

This series is distinct from CBC's 1966 production A World of Music.

Scheduling
This half-hour series was broadcast Sundays at 7:30 p.m. (Eastern) from 2 October 1960 to 2 July 1961.

References

External links
 

CBC Television original programming
1960 Canadian television series debuts
1961 Canadian television series endings